Amara brunnea is a species of beetle of the genus Amara in the family Carabidae.

References

brunnea
Beetles described in 1810